Amin Soleiman Askar (born 1 October 1985) is an Ethiopian professional football player who currently plays for Kristiansund. Askar also holds Norwegian citizenship, having lived in Norway since he was two years old.

Club career

Fredrikstad FK
A versatile footballer, Askar has played in several positions, including defence and midfield. On 27 March 2009, he signed a two-year contract with Fredrikstad.

SK Brann
Before the 2012 season, Askar signed a contract with the Tippeligaen club Brann.

Sarpsborg 08 FF
Before the 2015 season, Askar signed a loan-deal with the Tippeligaen club Sarpsborg 08.

International
In 2013 Askar decided to represent Ethiopia at senior level. Askar was supposed to make his debut against Nigeria in the African play-offs for the World Cup in Brazil, but the needed papers work did not arrive on time.

Career statistics

References

External links
Amin Askar player info at the official Fredrikstad FK website 
Guardian Football

1985 births
Living people
Association football defenders
Association football midfielders
Association football utility players
Norwegian footballers
Moss FK players
Fredrikstad FK players
SK Brann players
Sarpsborg 08 FF players
Şanlıurfaspor footballers
Kristiansund BK players
Norwegian First Division players
Eliteserien players
TFF First League players
Norwegian expatriate sportspeople in Turkey
Ethiopian emigrants to Norway
Naturalised citizens of Norway
Norwegian people of Ethiopian descent